was a town located in Kitaakita District, Akita Prefecture, Japan.

As of March 1, 2005, the town had an estimated population of 7,550 and a density of 66.9 persons per km². The total area was 112.8 km².

History
Aikawa was established on March 31, 1955, through the merger of the villages of Ochiai, Shimokoani, Kami-Ono and Shimo-Ono.

On March 22, 2005, Aikawa, along with the towns of Ani, Moriyoshi and Takanosu (all from Kitaakita District) merged to create the city of Kitaakita.

The town was served by the Japanese National Railways Aniai Line and Japan National Route 285.

External links
 Kitaakita official website 

Dissolved municipalities of Akita Prefecture
Kitaakita